Abel Antonio Conejo Olaya (born 21 March 1998) is a Spanish footballer who plays as a central midfielder for Burgos CF Promesas.

Club career
Conejo was born in Valladolid, Castile and León, and spent eight years at Real Valladolid's youth setup before leaving in April 2017. He joined Tercera División side Atlético Tordesillas in August, and made his senior debut on 27 August by starting in a 1–1 home draw against CD Cristo Atlético.

Conejo scored his first senior goal on 9 September 2017, netting his team's second in a 2–2 home draw against Unionistas de Salamanca CF. In July 2019, after being an undisputed starter, he moved to CD Numancia and was initially assigned to the reserves also in the fourth division.

Conejo made his first team debut with the Soria outfit on 17 July 2020, coming on as a late substitute for Curro Sánchez in a 0–3 loss at SD Huesca in the Segunda División championship. On 5 August, he signed for Zamora CF, newly-promoted to Segunda División B.

References

External links
 
 
 

1998 births
Living people
Footballers from Valladolid
Spanish footballers
Association football midfielders
Segunda División players
Segunda División B players
Segunda Federación players
Tercera División players
CD Numancia B players
CD Numancia players
Zamora CF footballers
Burgos CF Promesas players